The port of Amsterdam is a seaport in Amsterdam in North Holland, Netherlands. It is the 4th busiest port in Europe by metric tonnes of cargo. The port is located on the bank of a former bay named the IJ and the North Sea Canal, with which it is connected to the North Sea. The port was first used in the 13th century and was one of the main ports of the Dutch East India Company in the 17th century. Today, the port of Amsterdam is the second largest port in the Netherlands, the largest being the Port of Rotterdam.

History

The first port activities in Amsterdam date back to the 13th century. The port was first mentioned in the year 1342, when the city of Amsterdam received city rights.

In the Dutch Golden Age the port was one of the main harbours of the Dutch East India Company.

The North Holland Canal, that connects Amsterdam to Den Helder was dug between 1819 and 1824. The North Sea Canal, that connects Amsterdam to IJmuiden, was dug between 1865 and 1876.

Geography

The port of Amsterdam is located on the banks of the North Sea Canal and the IJ. The port is connected to the North Sea through the North Sea Canal, to Den Helder through the North Holland Canal, to the Markermeer through the IJ and the IJmeer, and to the Rhine through the Amsterdam-Rhine Canal.

The port comprises several harbour areas, which are part of the boroughs (Dutch: stadsdelen) of Westpoort, Westerpark, Centrum, and Zeeburg. From west to east the areas are:
 Afrika Harbour (Dutch: Afrikahaven)
 Amerika Harbour (Dutch: Amerikahaven)
 West Harbour (Dutch: Westhaven)
 Jan van Riebeeck Harbour (Dutch: Jan van Riebeeckhaven)
 Petroleum Harbour (Dutch: Petroleumhaven)
 Coen Harbour (Dutch: Coenhaven)
 Mercurius Harbour (Dutch: Mercuriushaven)
 Hout Harbour (Dutch: Houthaven)
 De Ruijter Quay (Dutch: De Ruijterkade)
 Eastern Trade Quay (Dutch: Oostelijke Handelskade)
 Eastern Harbour Area (Dutch: Oostelijk Havengebied)

Business operations
In terms of cargo throughput, the port of Amsterdam is the second largest port of the Netherlands after the port of Rotterdam.

In 2008, 6,029 sea vessels visited the port of Amsterdam, with a cargo throughput of 75.8 million tons, most of which was bulk cargo. That same year, the total container volume was 435,129 TEU. Both the number of vessels and the bulk cargo and container throughput increased compared to 2007.

In 2008, the total revenue was € 125.3 million and the net income € 45.0 million. This is a minor decrease compared to the revenue and income in 2007.

In 2008, the port itself had 361 employees, but the number of indirect employees is circa 55,000. On 7 July 2009, Mrs. Dertje Meijer was appointed as the director of the port by the government of Amsterdam.

Cruise port
The Port of Amsterdam is the 3rd biggest cruise port in Europe with 140 sea cruise ships and 1500 river cruise ships. Almost 700,000 cruise passengers per year visit Amsterdam. There are two cruise terminals: the Passenger Terminal Amsterdam in the city center, and one after the locks in IJmuiden.
In 2015 Amsterdam won the prize for International Cruise Port of the Year.

Amsterdam is homeport for the Koningsdam, the new ship from Holland America Line. In September 2015, the MSC Splendida visited Amsterdam; at 333.33 meters long and 38 meters wide, it was the biggest cruise ship ever in Amsterdam.

Sustainability
The Port of Amsterdam aims to be at the top of Europe's sustainable ports by 2030. The Port divides their sustainability vision into five themes: Energy transition in a circular economy, Environment and habitat, Clean and safe shipping, Work and credentials, and responsible trade chains.

International cooperation
The port of Amsterdam has a connection with the ports of the following cities:
 Port of Accra, Ghana
 Port of Beijing, China
 Port of Cape Town, South Africa
 Port of Halifax, Canada (Until 2019)
 Port of San Pédro, Côte d'Ivoire
 Port of Tianjin, China
 Port of Xiamen, China
 Gwangyang Bay Free Economic Zone, South Korea (2018)

Gallery

References

External links

Port of Amsterdam, official website

 
Ports and harbours of the North Sea
13th-century establishments in Europe
Amsterdam